Moulle is a commune in the Pas-de-Calais department in the Hauts-de-France region of France.

Geography
Moulle lies about 5 miles (8 km) northwest of Saint-Omer, at the D207 and N43 crossroads. The nearby Artesian wells of Houlle-Moulle produce 17 million cubic metres of fresh water for the city of Dunkirk.

Population

Places of interest
 The church of St. Nicholas, dating from the eighteenth century.

See also
Communes of the Pas-de-Calais department

References

External links

 Statistical data, INSEE

Communes of Pas-de-Calais